Capropygia unistriata, also known as the Black-banded pygmy boxfish, is a species of deepwater boxfish found in the waters over the continental shelf off the southern coast of Australia. This species grows to a length of  TL. This species is the only known member of its genus.

References

Aracanidae
Taxa named by Johann Jakob Kaup
Fish of Australia
Fish described in 1855